The 1894 Currie Cup was the second edition of the Currie Cup, the premier domestic rugby union competition in South Africa.

See also

 Currie Cup

References

1894
1894 in South African rugby union
Currie